Vogel Rok ("Bird Roc" in English) is an enclosed roller coaster in the Efteling amusement park in the Netherlands.

History and details

The name of the ride, Vogel Rok, refers to the adventure of Sinbad and the Bird Roc from the 1001 Arabian Nights; the extensive theming covers, beside the ride, the building and the queue line. The building has as a frontage a giant colorful Roc, the largest bird in Europe, according to the Guinness Book of Records. 
In the opening year there weren’t a lot of effects in the ride, and the link between the story and the ride wasn’t very clear. Since then a Serpent’s mouth has been added at the end of the ride, which lights up as the train goes through it. There used to be a laser-light-show at the queue, but that has been removed. This was done because the lights were too low, and people would look at them, thereby damaging their eyes. A new queue line was constructed in 2007, which led to the old queue line being partially abandoned. More themed decorations were also added.

Vogel Rok used to operate with three trains. Problems with the brakes in 2015 forced the ride to operate with two trains only. This issue was solved as part of a renovation in 2018.

The ride
Lasers project over the train as it climbs the lift-hill and seen to the left are four Rocs  flying off. In a strong curve down leftwards the train dives towards the ground and several more curves bring the train through a tunnel of lasers. 
The train then falls into a helix and goes through a Serpent’s mouth, which lights up as the train passes through it. The last curve is decorated with fiber optic lights, portraying the diamond treasure. 
Apparent wind-effects stimulate the ride-experience.

The ride has an onboard sound system with a synchronized soundtrack written by composer Ruud Bos, who also wrote the musical themes for Droomvlucht, Fata Morgana and Villa Volta.

References

Company information
Rollercoaster database
Coaster Kingdom

Roller coasters in the Netherlands
Enclosed roller coasters
Efteling
Roller coasters introduced in 1998
Roller coasters manufactured by Vekoma
Roc (mythology)
1998 establishments in the Netherlands
20th-century architecture in the Netherlands